The Huawei P series (formerly the Ascend P series) is a line of high-end and medium-range Android smartphones produced by Huawei. The P series was formerly marketed as part of Huawei's larger Ascend brand. Some models are called P smart.

Under the company's current hardware release cadence, P series phones are typically directed towards mainstream consumers as the company's flagship smartphones, refining and expanding upon technologies introduced in Mate series devices (which are typically positioned towards early adopters). The P series has featured a strong emphasis on camera functionality; since 2016, and beginning with the Huawei P9, Huawei has been in a co-engineering partnership with the German manufacturer Leica.

Phones

Ascend P1 
The Huawei P1 was released on July 19, 2012, in Canada, named as the Ascend P20 lite.

Ascend P2

Ascend P6

Ascend P7 

The Huawei Ascend P7 was announced on May 7, 2014, and released on June 7, 2014. It was the last phone to carry the Ascend name.

P8 lite, P8 and P8 Max 

The Huawei P8 was released in April 2015. The phone has a light painting function. The P8 Max was the sibling of the P8 in terms of phone size.

P9 Lite, P9 and P9 Plus 

The Huawei P9 and P9 Plus were the first phones from Huawei to receive a Leica Dual Camera from Leica AG, the P9 lite is the last smartphone in the series to have a single main camera. It was revealed on April 6, 2016, in Battersea Park.

P10 lite,  P10 and P10 Plus 

The Huawei P10 and P10 Plus were launched in Mobile World Congress 2017 on February 26, 2017, at Barcelona, Spain. It has a 20-megapixel monochrome sensor and a 12-megapixel RGB, in which the camera position was retained the same as the P9. Huawei partnered with the Pantone Color Institute in implementing their Color of the Year 2017 named Pantone Greenery into the P10, including 7 more color options.

P20 lite, P20 and P20 Pro 

Huawei P20 and P20 Pro were launched in Huawei's Special Event in Paris on March 27, 2018. Both of them received a high rating from DXOMark, with the P20 having 102 and P20 Pro having 109. They both also have a short notch while retaining the home button for the finger-print sensor. The pro version has a Leica triple camera setup featuring a 40 MP RGB sensor, 5X Hybrid Zoom, and an AI Scene and Object Recognition sensor capable of detecting 19 scenes.

Over 10 million Huawei P20 and P20 Pro units were sold globally.

P30 lite, P30 lite 2020, P30 and P30 Pro

The P30 and P30 Pro were unveiled in Paris during a media event on 26 March 2019 which features a main RYYB subpixel array (replacing green pixels for yellow) that is very sensitive to light making it able to shoot photos in very low lighting conditions. The P30 Pro also has a telephoto camera that utilises a triangular prism (using periscope technology with lenses and camera sensor 90° offset near the centre of the phone) reflecting light giving it the ability to have 5x optical, 10x hybrid and 50x digital zoom. These models do have Google Mobile Services installed.

P40 lite, P40 lite 5G, P40 lite E, P40, P40 Pro and P40 Pro+

The P40, P40 Pro and P40 Pro+ were unveiled in Paris on 26 March 2020. Some P40 models have a new 50 MP "Ultra Vision" wide sensor with Leica optics. The P40 Pro and P40 Pro+ are the first P series phones to feature a 90 Hz display and infrared face unlock. The software is also improved with a new Golden Snap feature that takes a burst of HDR+ photos and automatically picks the best shots. The P40 Pro+ has two telephoto lenses at 3x and 10x optical zoom, the latter of which is a periscope lens. These models do not have Google Mobile Services installed.

P50, P50E, P50 Pro and P50 Pocket 

The latest HUAWEI P50 series were officially launched on July 30, 2021. This year, there are two models launched: HUAWEI P50 and HUAWEI P50 Pro, which are the first flagship smartphones of the company to run on HarmonyOS operating system, upgraded with a new Leica camera and using a chipset. The latest flagship, Qualcomm Snapdragon 888, 4G version, which model HUAWEI P50 Pro have a Kirin 9000 chipset to choose from, but it supports 4G as well (not supporting 5G in both models). On March 17, 2022 Huwei launched HUAWEI P50E with Qualcomm Snapdragon 778G instead Snapdragon 888 and it is the last Huawei phone with Leica optics.

See also 
 Huawei Mate series
 Samsung Galaxy S series
 LG G series

References 

Huawei mobile phones